The Grutte Mûne (English: Great Mill, Dutch: De Grote Molen) is a smock mill in Broeksterwâld, Friesland, Netherlands which has been restored to working order. The mill is listed as a Rijksmonument, number 11679.

History
In 1880 a windmill was built on this site by millwright Oege Plantinga of Wânswert. This mill was burnt down in 1887. The Grutte Mûne was built to replace it by millwright Gerben van Wieren of Jannum. It was originally built with two Archimedes' screws. The mill was at one time equipped with Patent sails. In 1934, one of the Archimedes' screws was transferred to the Lytse Mûne. The spurwheel needed to drive the second screw was removed around 1986 and later reused in gristmill De Vlijt. A centrifugal pump was installed in 1943 and the mill ceased to work. The mill was restored in 1959 and again in 1975, at which time the patent system sails were replaced by commons sails. In 1977 it was sold to Stichting De Fryske Mole (English: Frisian Mills Foundation). A further restoration was undertaken in 1994. In 2010 and 2011 major restoration work was done. Amongst others it was decided to repair the riveted stocks dating from 1902 instead of replacing them with new welded steel stocks and to refit the patent system which had been removed in 1975.

Description

The Grutte Mûne is what the Dutch describe as an "achtkante grondzeiler". It is a smock mill winded by a winch. There is no stage, the sails reaching almost to the ground. The mill has a single-storey brick base and a two-storey smock. The smock and cap are thatched. The windshaft also carries the clasp arm brake wheel, which has 66 cogs. This drives the wallower (35 cogs) at the top of the upright shaft. At the bottom of the upright shaft, the crown wheel (48 cogs) drives the wooden Archimedes' screw via a gear wheel with 42 cogs. It is inclined at an angle of 15°. Each revolution of the screw lifts  of water.

References

External links

 Mill working with refitted Patent sails (youtube movie)
 

Windmills in Friesland
Windmills completed in 1887
Smock mills in the Netherlands
Rijksmonuments in Friesland
Dantumadiel
Octagonal buildings in the Netherlands